The Broch of Clickimin (also Clickimin or Clickhimin Broch) is a large, well-preserved but restored broch in Lerwick in Shetland, Scotland. Originally built on an island in Clickimin Loch, it was approached by a stone causeway. The broch is situated within a walled enclosure and, unusually for brochs, features a large "forework" or "blockhouse" between the opening in the enclosure and the broch itself. The site is maintained by Historic Scotland. According to its excavator, John R.C. Hamilton, there were several periods of occupation of the site: Late Bronze Age farmstead, Early Iron Age farmstead, Iron Age fort, broch period, and wheelhouse settlement.

Location
Clickimin Broch is situated on the south shore of the Clickimin Loch, three-quarters of a mile south-west of Lerwick on the Lerwick-Sumburgh road. It sits on a small promontory jutting into the loch. It is one of the best preserved broch sites in Shetland.

Description

The broch has an external diameter of around 20 metres and an internal diameter of around 9 metres. It is surrounded by a stone-walled fort consisting of a blockhouse and ringwork. The blockhouse is a free-standing drystone gateway set just within the entrance to the fort. Access to the broch is achieved via the entrance on the western side. The entrance passage may have had a "guard cell", now blocked up, on the right side, just inside the door jamb. The interior of the broch has two cells within the walls at ground-level. Excavations have revealed the postholes for internal timber buildings and in the 19th century there were said to have been radiating stone piers visible. There are two additional entrances to the broch at upper levels. The north entrance leads both into the interior and to a staircase. The other entrance leads to an intramural gallery.

History
The broch was originally excavated and cleared in 1861–2. Following major vandalism and dilapidation, parts of the site were rebuilt by the Office of Works in 1908–10. It was excavated again between 1953 and 1957 by J. R. C. Hamilton, who proposed a complex chronology for it. The earliest occupation of the site, according to Hamilton, was a small Late Bronze Age farmstead of the 7th or 6th centuries BC which (he said) was superseded by a larger circular Iron Age farmhouse built about the 5th century BC. In the 4th, or early 3rd century BC, Hamilton continued, a stone-walled fort consisting of the block-house and ringwork was constructed, which was in turn superseded by the broch in about the 1st century AD. In the 2nd and 3rd centuries AD a large wheelhouse was built within the reduced tower and with minor outhouses, storage pits and cattle stalls dug in the debris inside the older defences. 

In recent years Hamilton's schema has been challenged by archaeologists and others: the ring wall, blockhouse and broch are now usually assumed to be contemporary. For a full account see B. Smith, 'How not to reconstruct the Iron Age in Shetland: modern interpretations of Clickimin broch', Northern Studies, 47, 2015.

Archaeological Finds
Finds include stone lamps, whetstones, bone and whalebone objects, a die, a few bronze objects, and two fragments of Roman glass.

Images

References

External links

Clickimin Broch at CANMORE, Historic Environment Scotland

Scheduled Ancient Monuments in Shetland
Clickimin
Historic Scotland properties in Shetland
Former islands of Scotland
Lerwick